Zalustezhye is a rural locality (a village) in Luzhsky District of Leningrad Oblast, Russia. Its population was

References

Rural localities in Leningrad Oblast